Moustapha Sourang (24 July 1949 – 4 August 2020) was a Senegalese politician.

Biography
Sourang was born on 24 July 1949 in Saint-Louis in the French West Africa colony. He was a direct descendant of Amadou Bamba, founder of the Mouride brotherhood. He was the son of Massourang Sourang, a nobleman during the 1920s.

Sourang earned a master's degree in public law from Cheikh Anta Diop University in Dakar in 1974. He then studied at the University of Bordeaux in France, earning a doctorate in public law in 1975, a doctorate in political science in 1976, and another degree in public law in 1980 with a thesis titled La technique contractuelle dans les rapports États-entreprises étrangères : contribution à l'étude des conventions d'établissement conclues par les États africains.

Sourang taught at Cheikh Anta Diop University, becoming Dean of the Faculty of Legal Sciences in 1984 and serving until 1998. In May 2001, he was appointed by Abdoulaye Wade as Minister of Education, a position he held until 1 October 2009, when he was appointed Minister of Justice and Keeper of the Seals. On 4 December 2011, he was appointed by Wade as Minister of the Armed Forces, a position he held until 3 April 2012

Sourang held a number of honors throughout his career. He was a Commander of the Ordre national du Mérite du Sénégal, a Commander of the Ordre national du Mérite of France, an Officer of the Ordre des Palmes académiques, and an Officer of the Ordre national du Mérite of Burkina Faso.

References

1949 births
2020 deaths
Senegalese politicians
Cheikh Anta Diop University alumni
People from Saint-Louis, Senegal
Defense ministers of Senegal
Education ministers of Senegal
Justice ministers of Senegal